Schmidt's theorem may refer to:
 Krull–Schmidt theorem
 Wolfgang M. Schmidt's subspace theorem